Harley Morenstein (born July 20, 1985) is a Canadian actor, Internet personality, and vlogger. He co-created, produces, and hosts the YouTube show Epic Meal Time and its FYI television spin-off series Epic Meal Empire. He also runs a vlog channel. He is one of the two remaining original members of the show along with Ameer Atari.

Life and career 
Morenstein was born to English-speaking Jewish-Canadian parents in Montreal, Quebec. He attended Dawson College. He was a substitute teacher for a number of years at Lakeside Academy in Lachine, teaching history. Morenstein currently resides in Montreal.

Internet career

EpicMealTime 
In 2010 he co-created Epic Meal Time with Sterling Toth. The channel has over 6 million subscribers, and over 300 installments, 2 spin-offs, and has had guest stars such as Seth Rogen, Smosh, Tony Hawk, Arnold Schwarzenegger, and Kevin Smith, who directed the movie Tusk, in which Morenstein had a cameo appearance. He produces the show with his brother, Darren Morenstein, under company name Nexttime Productions. He starred in the TV adaptation of the show called Epic Meal Empire on FYI, which ran for two seasons.

Vlogging career 

Morenstein became famous on Vine in 2013 with his Vine on beard shaving. Since then he has been prevalent on Vine, and in 2015 after sporadically Vlogging on YouTube since 2014, he began Vlogging full-time, with videos featuring his girlfriend (though they have since broken up amicably as of 2019), dog, and the other members of EpicMealTime. He has amassed nearly 300,000 subscribers on his vlog channel.

Acting career 
Morenstein featured in one of Destorm's songs called "Epic wRap", which was uploaded on YouTube December 18, 2011. He has also been featured in fellow YouTube celebrity Freddie Wong's video web series Video Game High School, and appeared with Shane Dawson in a commercial for Just Dance 4.

After Kevin Smith appeared on an episode of the show, and an episode of the TV show, he offered Morenstein a cameo role in his Tusk, which was followed by a cameo in his Yoga Hosers. He also starred in Smith's portion of the anthology movie Holidays. He was in one of the lead roles in Smith's denouement to the Canadian horror trilogy, Moose Jaws. Morenstein was cast in the 2015 zombie film Dead Rising: Watchtower. He had a guest role on an episode of Nickelodeon's Game Shakers, in his first television role. Morenstein also made a cameo at the end of Rhett and Link's "Rub Some Bacon On It" music video in 2012, as well as in the duo's 2015 sketch "The Overly Complicated Coffee Order".

In October 2017, he appeared as the host of the Food Network special series Halloween Wars: Hayride of Horror.

Boxing record

Filmography

Film

Television

Web series

References

External links 

1985 births
Canadian YouTubers
Canadian male film actors
Canadian male television actors
Canadian male voice actors
Jewish Canadian male actors
Living people
Anglophone Quebec people
People from Pierrefonds-Roxboro
YouTube vloggers
Twitch (service) streamers
Male actors from Montreal
Canadian people of Jewish descent
Food and cooking YouTubers
McGill University Faculty of Education alumni
Dawson College alumni
Canadian schoolteachers
YouTube boxers